Arena is a hamlet in Delaware County, New York, United States. It is located southwest of Margaretville on the eastern end of Pepacton Reservoir.

References

Geography of Delaware County, New York
Hamlets in Delaware County, New York
Hamlets in New York (state)